Battista Dossi (ca. 1490–1548), also known as Battista de Luteri, was an Italian painter who belonged to the Ferrara School of Painting.  He spent nearly his entire career in service of the Court of Ferrara, where he worked with his older brother Dosso Dossi (c. 1489–1542).  It is believed that Battista worked in the Rome studio of Raphael from 1517 to 1520.  Battista's students include Camillo Filippi (c. 1500–1574).

Gallery

References
 Bénézit, Emmanuel, ed., Dictionnaire critique et documentaire des Peintres, Sculpteurs, Dessinateurs et Graveurs, Originally published 1911–1923. Paris, Librairie Gründ, 1976.
 Dizionario enciclopedico Bolaffi dei pittori e degli incisori italiani dall'XI al XX secolo, Turin, Giulio Bolaffi, 1972–1976.
 Gibbons, Felton, Dosso and Battista Dossi, Court Painters at Ferrara, Princeton, N.J., Princeton University Press, 1968.
 Groschner, Gabriele, Thomas Habersatter and Erika Mayr-Oehring, Masterworks, Residenzgalerie Salzburg, Salzburg 2002, 64.

External links
 Battista Dossi in ArtCyclopedia
 Works by Battista Dossi at Census of Ferrarese Paintings and Drawings
Dosso Dossi: Court Painter in Renaissance Ferrara, a full text exhibition catalog from The Metropolitan Museum of Art

16th-century Italian painters
Italian male painters
Painters from Ferrara
Italian Renaissance painters
Year of death unknown
Year of birth unknown
Year of birth uncertain